The Electronic Entertainment Expo 2012 (E3 2012) was the 18th E3 held. The event took place at the Los Angeles Convention Center in Los Angeles, California. It began on June 5, 2012, and ended on June 7, 2012, with 45,700 total attendees. It was televised on Spike and streamed online to computers, mobile devices, PlayStation Home and on Xbox Live via IGN's application. This was the last event to be broadcast by G4 along with being the last one to feature a physical press conference by Nintendo which mainly focused on games that were coming to the then upcoming Wii U video game console that launched later that year and was later considered to be a commercial failure.

Press conferences

Prior to the show, several companies made announcements regarding their products. Nintendo unveiled a new design for the Wii U controller, known now as the Wii U GamePad, along with a slightly modified console. Each of the three major console producers have also held or planned press conferences.

Konami
Konami held its 2nd annual pre-E3 show on May 31.

Microsoft
Microsoft's press conference took place on June 4 at 9:30am in the Galen Center. It was known as "Xbox: Entertainment Evolved," in the vein of Halo: Combat Evolved. It was streamed on Xbox Live and played live on SPIKE TV.

At the conference the company showed footage from upcoming sequels Halo 4, Call of Duty: Black Ops II, and Resident Evil 6. It also showed new entries in classic franchises, including the games Tomb Raider, Forza Horizon, South Park: The Stick of Truth, and many others. It also announced new intellectual property, including Ascend: New Gods and LocoCycle.

The company expanded its Kinect lineup with several new titles. Entertainer Usher made an appearance to demonstrate the Dance Central 3 dancing game. A castle-wrecking game called Wreckateer was also demonstrated. Matter, an Xbox 360-exclusive title for the Kinect was also shown.

Microsoft also unveiled expanded entertainment and multimedia features for the Xbox 360. The company announced new sports content partnerships, including those with the National Basketball Association, National Hockey League, and ESPN to bring their content to the console. Xbox Music was also revealed, which will carry the Xbox brand to Windows 8. The company unveiled Internet Explorer 10 for the console, which can be controlled via tablet devices. The console maker also announced Xbox SmartGlass, a technology designed to allow play experiences from mobile devices, including those running Windows 8 and Windows Phone operating systems.

Electronic Arts
Electronic Arts took the stage on June 4 at 1:00pm, showcasing ten titles or families of titles. Included were games such as Crysis 3, Dead Space 3, Medal of Honor: Warfighter, Need for Speed: Most Wanted and SimCity.

Ubisoft
Ubisoft held a press conference on June 4 at 3:00pm, showing many titles including Assassin's Creed III, Far Cry 3, Just Dance 4, Rayman Legends, Tom Clancy's Splinter Cell: Blacklist, Watch Dogs and ZombiU.

Sony
Sony's press conference took place on June 4 at 6:00pm at the Los Angeles Memorial Sports Arena. Sony and its partners showcased existing titles, including first party games such as God of War: Ascension, PlayStation All-Stars Battle Royale and The Last of Us and third party games such as Assassin's Creed III and Far Cry 3.

Sony also announced a new title called Beyond: Two Souls.

Sony provided updates on the PlayStation Suite mobile framework, renaming it to PlayStation Mobile and adding HTC as a partner. It also unveiled the Wonderbook augmented reality reading system.

Nintendo
Nintendo's main press conference took place on June 5 at 9:00am in the Nokia Theatre. The company showed 23 Wii U titles, including first party games like Pikmin 3, and New Super Mario Bros. U, and third party games like Batman: Arkham City: Armored Edition, Scribblenauts: Unlimited, and ZombiU. The company also showed more casual games, including Wii Fit U and Nintendo Land.

The following day, June 6, Nintendo held a smaller "software showcase" conference based solely on the Nintendo 3DS, showcasing new content and games such as New Super Mario Bros. 2, Paper Mario: Sticker Star and Luigi's Mansion: Dark Moon. This was also the last traditional Nintendo E3 press conference as E3 2013 onwards (with the exception of E3 2016, which only had Nintendo Treehouse Live) would just be a Nintendo Direct.

List of notable exhibitors

2K Games
Activision
Alienware
Atari
Bethesda Softworks
Bohemia Interactive
Capcom
Crytek
Disney Interactive
Electronic Arts
Havok
Konami
Microsoft
Namco Bandai Games
Nintendo
Nvidia
Riot Games
Sega
Sony
Sony Online Entertainment
Square Enix
Tecmo Koei
Trion Worlds
Ubisoft
Valve
Wargaming
Warner Brothers Entertainment
Zynga

List of featured games

Note: This is THQ's last E3 appearance before it was filed for Bankruptcy.

References

2012 in Los Angeles
2012 in video gaming
2012
June 2012 events in the United States